Excirolana is a genus of isopods in the family Cirolanidae. There are about 15 described species in Excirolana.

Species
 Excirolana affinis (Jones, 1971)
 Excirolana argentinae (Giambiagi, 1931)
 Excirolana armata (Dana, 1853)
 Excirolana braziliensis H. Richardson, 1912
 Excirolana chamensis Brusca & Weinberg, 1987
 Excirolana chilensis Richardson, 1912A
 Excirolana chiltoni (H. Richardson, 1905)
 Excirolana geniculata Jones, 1971
 Excirolana hirsuticauda Menzies, 1962A
 Excirolana latipes (Barnard, 1914B)
 Excirolana linguifrons (H. Richardson, 1899)
 Excirolana mayana (Ives, 1891)
 Excirolana monodi Carvacho, 1977
 Excirolana natalensis (Vanhoffen, 1914)
 Excirolana orientalis (Dana, 1853)

References

Cymothoida
Isopod genera